The 1987–88 season was the 86th season in which Dundee competed at a Scottish national level, playing in the Scottish Premier Division. Dundee would finish in 7th place. Dundee would also compete in both the Scottish League Cup and the Scottish Cup, where they were knocked out by Aberdeen in the semi-finals of the League Cup, and by inter-city rivals Dundee United in a second replay in the quarter-finals of the Scottish Cup.

Dundee would change kit manufacturers to Matchwinner, introducing white and red stripes to the top of their jersey. Striker Tommy Coyne would top the Premier Division scoring charts with 33 goals in the league.

Scottish Premier Division 

Statistics provided by Dee Archive.

League table

Scottish League Cup 

Statistics provided by Dee Archive.

Scottish Cup 

Statistics provided by Dee Archive.

Player statistics 
Statistics provided by Dee Archive

|}

See also 

 List of Dundee F.C. seasons

References

External links 

 1987–88 Dundee season on Fitbastats

Dundee F.C. seasons
Dundee